Goose Lake National Forest was established as the Goose Lake Forest Reserve by the U.S. Forest Service in Oregon on August 21, 1906 with .  It became a National Forest on March 4, 1907. On July 1, 1908 the entire forest was added to Fremont National Forest and the name was discontinued.

References

External links
Forest History Society
Forest History Society:Listing of the National Forests of the United States Text from Davis, Richard C., ed. Encyclopedia of American Forest and Conservation History. New York: Macmillan Publishing Company for the Forest History Society, 1983. Vol. II, pp. 743-788.

Former National Forests of Oregon
1906 establishments in Oregon
Protected areas established in 1906
1908 disestablishments in Oregon